Bryum bharatiense is a species of moss native to Antarctica. It was discovered by a team of researchers from the Central University of Punjab.

Etymology
The species has been named after Bharati, the Indian research station in Antarctica. The station itself was named after the Hindu goddess Bharati.

Habitat
The moss predominantly grows in areas where penguins breed in large numbers.

See also
Wildlife of Antarctica

References

bharatiense